Amt Märkische Schweiz (roughly, "the hill region of the March") is an Amt or collective municipality in the district of Märkisch-Oderland in the State of Brandenburg, Germany. Its seat is in Buckow.

The Amt Märkische Schweiz consists of the following municipalities:
Buckow
Garzau-Garzin
Oberbarnim
Rehfelde
Waldsieversdorf

Demography

References

Markische Schweiz
Märkisch-Oderland